Lot Pond is a lake in Lowndes County, Georgia, located four miles southwest of Lake Park at an elevation of 112 feet above mean sea-level. It is described as a former clay pit. The lake is approximately 22 acres in size.

A former variant name was "Horselot Pond". Peat was once mined at Lot Pond.

References

Lakes of Georgia (U.S. state)
Bodies of water of Lowndes County, Georgia